Keran Collins (born 1954) is an Irish retired Gaelic footballer who played as a midfielder for the Cork senior team.

Collins joined the panel during the 1974 championship and was a regular member of the starting fifteen for just one season during the 1976 championship. During that time he enjoyed little success, ending up as a Munster runner-up on one occasion.

At club level Collins is a two-time All-Ireland medalist with Nemo Rangers. In addition to this he has also won four Munster medals and five county club championship medals.

References

1954 births
Living people
Nemo Rangers Gaelic footballers
Cork inter-county Gaelic footballers